Metro Santa Cruz, a free-circulation weekly newspaper published in Santa Cruz, California from 1994 to 2009, was renamed the Santa Cruz Weekly on May 6, 2009. The weekly continues, under its new name, to cover news, arts and entertainment in Santa Cruz County, a coastal area that includes Capitola, Aptos, Boulder Creek, Scotts Valley and Watsonville.

Popular features of Metro Santa Cruz included Nuz, a free-wheeling un-bylined political column, the "ClubGrid" music calendar and Muz, a music column. The Nuz name was retired upon the publication's renaming.

Locally based in Santa Cruz, the alternative weekly is owned by Metro Newspapers, a company started by UC Santa Cruz graduate and former Santa Cruz publisher Dan Pulcrano. The company also publishes Metro in the adjacent Santa Clara Valley, a.k.a. Silicon Valley and the North Bay Bohemian in the Sonoma/Napa/Marin area.

The newspaper commemorated its 15th anniversary in April 2009 with a photographic tribute to prominent Santa Cruzans, including wet suit inventor Jack O'Neill, musicians Greg Camp and Dale Ockerman, former California secretary of state Bruce McPherson and others. The essay was photographed by Santa Cruz native Dina Scoppettone. The issue was the last one published under the Metro Santa Cruz name.

Though no announcement was made, the name change was foreshadowed in the final weeks. The word "weekly" was added to the front page logo, and in the final issue's front page, the word "Metro" is cut off and seemingly sliding off the left side of the page.

The publication is affiliated with the SantaCruz.com community web portal, operated by a sister company, Boulevards New Media.

References

External links
Metro Santa Cruz
MetroSantaCruz: PDF edition
SantaCruz.com
SantaCruzWeekly.com
Facebook
Twitter

Alternative weekly newspapers published in the United States
Weekly newspapers published in California
Publications established in 1994
Santa Cruz, California